Ivan A. Rubanyuk (August 29, 1896 – October 3, 1959) was a Soviet colonel general.

Career
He was born in modern-day Belarus. He served in the Imperial Russian Army in World War I before going over to the Bolsheviks. During the Great Purge, he was removed from the army but was later re-instated. 

As colonel, he became commander of the 11th Rifle Corps in October 1942 before being promoted to major general on November 10, 1942.
Between February 1943 and April 1947, he was the commander of the 10th Guards Rifle Corps.

As a lieutenant general, he was made commander of the 14th Army in April 1952 and the 25th Army in May 1953. He was promoted to colonel general on August 8, 1955. He was a recipient of the Order of Lenin, the Order of the Red Banner, the Order of Suvorov and the Order of Kutuzov. He died in Moscow.

References

1896 births
1959 deaths
People from Drahichyn District
Soviet colonel generals
Belarusian people of World War I
Russian military personnel of World War I
Soviet military personnel of the Russian Civil War
Soviet military personnel of World War II
Recipients of the Order of Lenin
Recipients of the Order of the Red Banner
Recipients of the Order of Suvorov, 2nd class
Recipients of the Order of Kutuzov, 2nd class
Military Academy of the General Staff of the Armed Forces of the Soviet Union alumni